Carvin may refer to the following people:
 Given name
Carvin Goldstone (born 1984), South African comedian
Carvin Nkanata (born 1991), American-born Kenyan sprinter

Surname
 Andy Carvin, American entrepreneur
Chad Carvin (born 1974), American swimmer
Jim Carvin (1929–2009), American political consultant
Louis-Albert Carvin (1875–1951), French sculptor
Michael Carvin (born 1944), American jazz drummer